This is a list of the mammal species recorded in Djibouti. Of the mammal species in Djibouti, one is critically endangered, another is endangered, five are vulnerable, and two are near threatened.

The following tags are used to highlight each species' conservation status as assessed by the International Union for Conservation of Nature:

Some species were assessed using an earlier set of criteria. Species assessed using this system have the following instead of near threatened and least concern categories:

Order: Tubulidentata (aardvarks) 

The order Tubulidentata consists of a single species, the aardvark. Tubulidentata are characterised by their teeth which lack a pulp cavity and form thin tubes which are continuously worn down and replaced.

Family: Orycteropodidae
Genus: Orycteropus
 Aardvark, Orycteropus afer LC

Order: Sirenia (manatees and dugongs) 

Sirenia is an order of fully aquatic, herbivorous mammals that inhabit rivers, estuaries, coastal marine waters, swamps, and marine wetlands. All four species are endangered.

Family: Dugongidae
Genus: Dugong
 Dugong, Dugong dugon VU

Order: Primates 

The order Primates contains humans and their closest relatives: lemurs, lorisoids, tarsiers, monkeys, and apes.

Suborder: Strepsirrhini
Infraorder: Lemuriformes
Superfamily: Lorisoidea
Family: Galagidae
Genus: Galago
 Senegal bushbaby, Galago senegalensis LR/lc
Suborder: Haplorhini
Infraorder: Simiiformes
Parvorder: Catarrhini
Superfamily: Cercopithecoidea
Family: Cercopithecidae (Old World monkeys)
Genus: Papio
Hamadryas baboon, Papio hamadryas LR/nt

Order: Rodentia (rodents) 

Rodents make up the largest order of mammals, with over 40% of mammalian species. They have two incisors in the upper and lower jaw which grow continually and must be kept short by gnawing.

Suborder: Hystricognathi
Family: Bathyergidae
Genus: Heterocephalus
 Naked mole-rat, Heterocephalus glaber LC
Suborder: Sciurognathi
Family: Sciuridae (squirrels)
Subfamily: Xerinae
Tribe: Xerini
Genus: Xerus
 Unstriped ground squirrel, Xerus rutilus LC
Family: Cricetidae
Subfamily: Lophiomyinae
Genus: Lophiomys
 Maned rat, Lophiomys imhausi LC
Family: Muridae (mice, rats, voles, gerbils, hamsters, etc.)
Subfamily: Deomyinae
Genus: Acomys
 Cairo spiny mouse, Acomys cahirinus LC
 Louise's spiny mouse, Acomys louisae LC
 Mullah spiny mouse, Acomys mullah LC
Subfamily: Gerbillinae
Genus: Gerbillus
 Somalia gerbil, Gerbillus dunni DD
 Somalian gerbil, Gerbillus somalicus DD
 Waters's gerbil, Gerbillus watersi LC
Family: Ctenodactylidae
Genus: Pectinator
 Speke's pectinator, Pectinator spekei DD

Order: Lagomorpha (lagomorphs) 

The lagomorphs comprise two families, Leporidae (hares and rabbits), and Ochotonidae (pikas). Though they can resemble rodents, and were classified as a superfamily in that order until the early 20th century, they have since been considered a separate order. They differ from rodents in a number of physical characteristics, such as having four incisors in the upper jaw rather than two.

Family: Leporidae (rabbits, hares)
Genus: Lepus
 Cape hare, Lepus capensis LR/lc

Order: Erinaceomorpha (hedgehogs and gymnures) 

The order Erinaceomorpha contains a single family, Erinaceidae, which comprise the hedgehogs and gymnures. The hedgehogs are easily recognised by their spines while gymnures look more like large rats.

Family: Erinaceidae (hedgehogs)
Subfamily: Erinaceinae
Genus: Hemiechinus
 Desert hedgehog, Hemiechinus aethiopicus LR/lc

Order: Soricomorpha (shrews, moles, and solenodons) 

The "shrew-forms" are insectivorous mammals. The shrews and solenodons closely resemble mice while the moles are stout-bodied burrowers.

Family: Soricidae (shrews)
Subfamily: Crocidurinae
Genus: Crocidura
 Savanna shrew, Crocidura fulvastra LC

Order: Chiroptera (bats) 

The bats' most distinguishing feature is that their forelimbs are developed as wings, making them the only mammals capable of flight. Bat species account for about 20% of all mammals.

Family: Pteropodidae (flying foxes, Old World fruit bats)
Subfamily: Pteropodinae
Genus: Eidolon
 Straw-coloured fruit bat, Eidolon helvum LC
Family: Vespertilionidae
Subfamily: Vespertilioninae
Genus: Eptesicus
 Botta's serotine, Eptesicus bottae LC
Genus: Neoromicia
 Cape serotine, Neoromicia capensis LC
Genus: Nycticeinops
 Schlieffen's bat, Nycticeinops schlieffeni LC
Genus: Scotophilus
 African yellow bat, Scotophilus dinganii LC
Family: Rhinopomatidae
Genus: Rhinopoma
 Egyptian mouse-tailed bat, R. cystops 
 Lesser mouse-tailed bat, Rhinopoma hardwickei LC
 Greater mouse-tailed bat, Rhinopoma microphyllum LC
Family: Molossidae
Genus: Chaerephon
 Spotted free-tailed bat, Chaerephon bivittata LC
 Little free-tailed bat, Chaerephon pumila LC
Genus: Otomops
 Large-eared free-tailed bat, Otomops martiensseni NT
Family: Emballonuridae
Genus: Coleura
 African sheath-tailed bat, Coleura afra LC
Genus: Taphozous
 Naked-rumped tomb bat, Taphozous nudiventris LC
 Egyptian tomb bat, Taphozous perforatus LC
Family: Nycteridae
Genus: Nycteris
 Egyptian slit-faced bat, Nycteris thebaica LC
Family: Megadermatidae
Genus: Cardioderma
 Heart-nosed bat, Cardioderma cor LC
Family: Rhinolophidae
Subfamily: Rhinolophinae
Genus: Rhinolophus
Lesser horseshoe bat, R. hipposideros 
Subfamily: Hipposiderinae
Genus: Asellia
 Trident leaf-nosed bat, Asellia tridens LC
Genus: Hipposideros
 Sundevall's roundleaf bat, Hipposideros caffer LC
 Ethiopian large-eared roundleaf bat, Hipposideros megalotis NT
Genus: Triaenops
 Persian trident bat, Triaenops persicus LC

Order: Cetacea (whales) 

The order Cetacea includes whales, dolphins and porpoises. They are the mammals most fully adapted to aquatic life with a spindle-shaped nearly hairless body, protected by a thick layer of blubber, and forelimbs and tail modified to provide propulsion underwater.

Suborder: Mysticeti
Family: Balaenopteridae (baleen whales)
Genus: Balaenoptera 
 Common minke whale, Balaenoptera acutorostrata
 Fin whale, Balaenoptera physalus
 Blue whale, Balaenoptera musculus
Genus: Megaptera
 Humpback whale, Megaptera novaeangliae
Suborder: Odontoceti
Superfamily: Platanistoidea
Family: Delphinidae (marine dolphins)
Genus: Delphinus
 Long-beaked common dolphin, Delphinus capensis DD
Genus: Feresa
 Pygmy killer whale, Feresa attenuata DD
Genus: Globicephala
 Short-finned pilot whale, Globicephala macrorhyncus DD
Genus: Lagenodelphis
 Fraser's dolphin, Lagenodelphis hosei DD
Genus: Grampus
 Risso's dolphin, Grampus griseus DD
Genus: Orcinus
 Killer whale, Orcinus orca DD
Genus: Peponocephala
 Melon-headed whale, Peponocephala electra DD
Genus: Sousa
 Indian humpback dolphin, Sousa plumbea DD
Genus: Stenella
 Pantropical spotted dolphin, Stenella attenuata DD
 Striped dolphin, Stenella coeruleoalba DD
 Spinner dolphin, Stenella longirostris DD
Genus: Steno
 Rough-toothed dolphin, Steno bredanensis DD
Genus: Tursiops
 Common bottlenose dolphin, Tursiops truncatus
 Indo-Pacific bottlenose dolphin, Tursiops aduncus
Family: Physeteridae (sperm whales)
Genus: Physeter
 Sperm whale, Physeter catodon DD
Family: Kogiidae (dwarf sperm whales)
Genus: Kogia
 Pygmy sperm whale, Kogia breviceps DD
 Dwarf sperm whale, Kogia sima DD
Superfamily Ziphioidea
Family: Ziphidae (beaked whales)
Genus: Indopacetus
 Tropical bottlenose whale, Indopacetus pacificus DD
Genus: Mesoplodon
 Ginkgo-toothed beaked whale, Mesoplodon ginkgodens DD
 Blainville's beaked whale, Mesoplodon densirostris DD
Genus: Ziphius
 Cuvier's beaked whale, Ziphius cavirostris DD

Order: Carnivora (carnivorans) 

There are over 260 species of carnivorans, the majority of which feed primarily on meat. They have a characteristic skull shape and dentition.

Suborder: Feliformia
Family: Felidae (cats)
Subfamily: Felinae
Genus: Acinonyx
Cheetah A. jubatus, presence uncertain
Genus: Caracal
Caracal, C. caracal 
Genus: Leptailurus
Serval, L. serval 
Subfamily: Pantherinae
Genus: Panthera
Leopard, P. pardus 
African leopard, P. p. pardus
Family: Viverridae (civets, mongooses, etc.)
Subfamily: Viverrinae
Genus: Genetta
 Abyssinian genet, G. abyssinica 
Family: Hyaenidae (hyaenas)
Genus: Crocuta
 Spotted hyena, C. crocuta LC
Genus: Hyaena
Striped hyena, H. hyaena 
Suborder: Caniformia
Family: Canidae (dogs, foxes)
Genus: Canis
African golden wolf, C. lupaster 
Genus: Lupulella
 Black-backed jackal, L. mesomelas  
Family: Mustelidae (mustelids)
Genus: Ictonyx
 Striped polecat, I. striatus LC
Genus: Mellivora
Honey badger, M. capensis

Order: Perissodactyla (odd-toed ungulates) 

The odd-toed ungulates are browsing and grazing mammals. They are usually large to very large, and have relatively simple stomachs and a large middle toe.

Family: Equidae (horses etc.)
Genus: Equus
 African wild ass, E. africanus  presence uncertain
Somali wild ass, E. a. somaliensis presence uncertain

Order: Artiodactyla (even-toed ungulates) 

The even-toed ungulates are ungulates whose weight is borne about equally by the third and fourth toes, rather than mostly or entirely by the third as in perissodactyls. There are about 220 artiodactyl species, including many that are of great economic importance to humans.

Family: Suidae (pigs)
Subfamily: Phacochoerinae
Genus: Phacochoerus
 Desert warthog, Phacochoerus aethiopicus LR/lc
 Common warthog, Phacochoerus africanus LR/lc
Family: Bovidae (cattle, antelope, sheep, goats)
Subfamily: Antilopinae
Genus: Dorcatragus
 Beira, Dorcatragus megalotis VU
Genus: Gazella
 Dorcas gazelle, Gazella dorcas VU
 Soemmerring's gazelle, Gazella soemmerringii VU
Genus: Litocranius
 Gerenuk, Litocranius walleri LR/cd
Genus: Madoqua
 Salt's dik-dik, Madoqua saltiana LR/lc
Genus: Oreotragus
 Klipspringer, Oreotragus oreotragus LR/cd
Subfamily: Bovinae
Genus: Tragelaphus
 Lesser kudu, Tragelaphus imberbis NT possibly extirpated
 Greater kudu, Tragelaphus strepsiceros LC possibly extirpated
Subfamily: Cephalophinae
Genus: Sylvicapra
 Common duiker, Sylvicapra grimmia LR/lc
Subfamily: Hippotraginae
Genus: Oryx
 East African oryx, Oryx beisa EN possibly extirpated

Extirpated 
The following species are locally extinct in Djibouti:
 Lion, Panthera leo

See also
Wildlife of Djibouti
List of chordate orders
Lists of mammals by region
List of prehistoric mammals
Mammal classification]

References

External links

Djibouti
Djibouti
Fauna of Djibouti
Mammals